Cattle Queen of Montana is a 1954 American Western film shot in Technicolor directed by Allan Dwan and starring Barbara Stanwyck and Ronald Reagan. The supporting cast includes Gene Evans, Lance Fuller, Jack Elam, Chubby Johnson, and Morris Ankrum.

Plot
Pop Jones inherits a piece of family land in Montana, so he and his daughter, Sierra Nevada, decide to leave their Texas ranch and move there. As she bathes in a pond along the trail, Sierra Nevada encounters a stranger, Farrell, a hired gunman who warns her about dangerous Indians nearby.

Farrell is on his way to work for Tom McCord, a rich rancher. Quite a bit of rustling has been going on in the territory of late. McCord is in cahoots with Indians, in particular Natchakoa of the Blackfoot tribe, whose braves stampede the Jones family's cattle, knock Sierra cold, wound her cowhand Nat and kill Pop, after which McCord steals a document from Pop's dead body that grants rights to the land.

Sierra is nursed back to health by Colorados, a young Blackfoot who attends school among the whites, to the displeasure of the tribal chief, his father. McCord offers a $2,000 bounty to Farrell if he kills Sierra and Nat, but instead Farrell comes to her rescue.

Farrell reveals that he is actually an agent for the U.S. Cavalry, investigating the rustling and killing. With the help of Sierra, he blows up a McCord wagon filled with ammunition being sold to the Indians, doing away with McCord once and for all and bringing peace to the territory at last.

Cast
 Barbara Stanwyck as Sierra Nevada Jones 
 Ronald Reagan as Farrell 
 Gene Evans as Tom McCord 
 Lance Fuller as Colorados 
 Anthony Caruso as Natchakoa 
 Jack Elam as Yost 
 Yvette Duguay as Starfire 
 Morris Ankrum as J.I. 'Pop' Jones 
 Chubby Johnson as Nat Collins 
 Myron Healey as Hank 
 Rodd Redwing as Powhani 
 Hugh Sanders as Col. Carrington 
 Byron Foulger as Land Office Employee 
 Burt Mustin as Dan

Critical response
Variety reported that the film was "a listless and ordinary western" with a "screenplay [that] is short on imagination and long on cliche," and that "Allan Dwan’s direction is slow moving." A review of the film in The New York Times described Stanwyck as "pretty as a Western sunset in her curly, carrot colored hairdo," but that she "is given little to do except chase around the lush mountain greenery and shoot it out with the bad men;" Reagan's performance was described as "stalwart and obvious."

Influence
In the 1985 film Back to the Future, Marty McFly travels back to 1955 and notices the Cattle Queen of Montana displayed on the marquee at the Essex Theater in Hill Valley. Cattle Queen of Montana was also the last film that President Reagan watched during his eight years in office (according to records, he watched it at Camp David on January 14, 1989, six days before leaving the presidency).

See also
 List of American films of 1954
 Ronald Reagan films

References

External links
 
 

1954 Western (genre) films
1954 films
Films directed by Allan Dwan
Films set in Montana
Films shot in Montana
RKO Pictures films
Films with screenplays by Howard Estabrook
American Western (genre) films
1950s English-language films
1950s American films